Simon Shanks (October 16, 1971 – January 5, 2006) was a National Football League player for the Arizona Cardinals in 1995. An alumnus of Tennessee State University, he played linebacker in his sole professional season, leading the Cardinals defense with 27 tackles. Shanks was killed in a robbery at his home in Phoenix on January 5, 2006. Three men approached Shanks and his friend in his garage working out. His wife was locked in the bathroom of the house while the men beat Shanks and his friend. They were both shot, with Shanks being shot fatally. His other friend was shot in the neck, surviving.

References

External links
Simon Shanks statistics''
CBS article covering Shanks' death

1971 births
2006 deaths
2006 murders in the United States
American football linebackers
American murder victims
Arizona Cardinals players
Coahoma Tigers football players
Tennessee State Tigers football players
People murdered in Arizona
Deaths by firearm in Arizona
Male murder victims
Players of American football from Mississippi
People from Laurel, Mississippi